Mi querida Isabel (English: My dear Isabel) is a Mexican telenovela produced by Angelli Nesma Medina for Televisa. This telenovela is a remake of the 1975 Mexican telenovela Paloma, original story by Marissa Garrido. It premiered on Canal de las Estrellas on December 9, 1996 and ended on April 25, 1997.

Karla Álvarez and Ernesto Laguardia starred as protagonists, while Jacqueline Andere starred as main antagonist.

Plot 
Isabel is a law student who takes home from the death of his mother. His father is an alcoholic lawyer, and his brother is a rebel who is only interested in music. Isabel is interested in the case of Sagrario, carrying prey years for a crime he swears he did not commit and decides to do everything possible to put it free.

Cast 
 
Karla Álvarez as Isabel Rivas
Ernesto Laguardia as Luis Daniel Márquez Riquelme
Jacqueline Andere as Doña Clara Riquelme Vda. de Márquez
Jorge Salinas as Alejandro
José Elías Moreno as Manuel Rivas
Nuria Bages as Sagrario
Roberto Ballesteros as Federico
Roberto Blandón as Oscar
Carlos Bracho as Bernardo
Silvia Caos as Miguelina
Dacia González as Lupe
Dacia Arcaráz as Julia
Eduardo Liñán as Hugo del Real
Marina Marín as Irma
Patricia Martínez as Amanda
Juan Felipe Preciado as Rivero
Eduardo Noriega as Erasto
Yadira Santana as Aleida
Víctor Hugo Vieyra as Octavio Romero
Abraham Stavans as Medina
Ariadna Welter as Tita
Renata Flores as Endolina
Arlette Pacheco as Margarita
Vanessa Angers as Rosa
Silvia Campos as Mary
Mario Carballido as Rafael
Luis Gatica as Ricardo
Rafael Inclán as Pantaleón
Ernesto Godoy as Felipe
Mauricio Islas as Marcos Rivas
Mercedes Molto as Eugenia
Renée Varsi as Adela Márquez Riquelme
Abraham Ramos as Rolando
Indra Zuno as Leticia
Lino Martone as Aldo
Archie Lanfranco as Dr. Carlos
Carlos Peniche as Mecala
Eduardo Iduñate as Callejero
Julio Mannino as Jorge
Gustavo Rojo as Joaquín
Gabriel Soto as Juan
Maricruz Nájera as Jesusita
Alfonso Iturralde as Ernesto
Ismael Larrumbe as Pedro
Marco Antonio Calvillo as Cácaro
Octavio Menduet as Detective
Polly as Clara (young)
Guillermo Aguilar
Raúl Padilla "Chóforo"
Rodolfo Lago
Aída Naredo
Virginia Gimeno
Lupe Vázquez
Enrique Hidalgo
Ricardo Vera
Ana María de la Torre
Zamorita
Martín Barraza
Chuty Rodríguez
Raúl Castellanos
Jonathan Herrera
Milagros Rueda
Carmen Rodríguez
Tere Pave
Fabrizio Mercini
Paty Solorio
Mané Macedo
Daniela Garmendia
Manuel Cepeda
Enrique Borja Baena

Awards and nominations

References

External links

1996 telenovelas
Mexican telenovelas
1996 Mexican television series debuts
1997 Mexican television series endings
Spanish-language telenovelas
Television shows set in Mexico
Televisa telenovelas